was a Japanese photographer.

References

Japanese photographers
1933 births
1993 deaths